Pinocembrin is a flavanone, a type of flavonoid. It is an antioxidant found in damiana, honey, fingerroot, and propolis.

Pinocembrin can be converted biosynthetically to pinobanksin by hydroxylation adjacent to the ketone. Studies have shown that pinocembrin has potential as a drug to treat cerebral ischemia, intracerebral hemorrhage, neurodegenerative diseases, cardiovascular diseases and atherosclerosis as well as other diseases.

See also 
 Pinobanksin

References

External links

Aromatase inhibitors
Flavanones
Flavonoid antioxidants
Honey